Puya mollis is a species in the genus Puya. This species is endemic to Bolivia.

References

mollis
Flora of Bolivia